Cala Sant Vicenç is a small resort town in north-eastern Mallorca, Spain. It consists of three small beaches, plus a few bars and restaurants catering for tourists. Located at one end of the town is the hypogeum of Cala Sant Vicenç, perhaps the most spectacular hypogeum on the island.

Populated places in Mallorca
Beaches of Mallorca
Pollença
Beaches of the Balearic Islands